Kolibabovce is a village and municipality in the Sobrance District in the Košice Region of east Slovakia.

History
In historical records the village was first mentioned in 1567.

Geography
The village lies at an altitude of 175 metres and covers an area of 3.826 km².
It has a population of 188 people.

Culture
The village has a football pitch

Genealogical resources

The records for genealogical research are available at the state archive "Statny Archiv in Presov, Slovakia"

 Roman Catholic church records (births/marriages/deaths): 1837–1931 (parish B)
 Greek Catholic church records (births/marriages/deaths): 1834–1902 (parish B)

See also
 List of municipalities and towns in Slovakia

External links
 
http://en.e-obce.sk/obec/kolibabovce/kolibabovce.html
https://web.archive.org/web/20140923171227/http://www.tic.sk/kolibabovce.html
Surnames of living people in Kolibabovce

Villages and municipalities in Sobrance District